Râul Alb may refer to the following rivers in Romania:

Râul Alb, a tributary of the Bârzava in Caraș-Severin County
Râul Alb (Dâmbovița), a tributary of the Dâmbovița in Dâmbovița County
Râul Alb (Strei), a tributary of the Strei in Hunedoara County
Râul Alb, a tributary of the Groșeni in Arad County
 Pârâul Alb (Timiș), a tributary of the Feneș in Caraș-Severin County

See also 
 Pârâul Alb (disambiguation)
 Izvorul Alb (disambiguation)